The 2012 WAFF Championship was the 7th WAFF Championship, an international tournament for member nations of the West Asian Football Federation. It was hosted by Kuwait from 8 to 20 December 2012. The defending champions were Kuwait. However, they did not get past the group stage.  The tournament was won by Syria for the first time.

Venues

Draw of participating teams
The draw took place on 16 September 2012 in Kuwait City, Kuwait. The eleven teams were drawn into three groups based on team rankings. Two groups include four teams and one group has three teams.

Did not enter
 and  did not enter.

Squads

Tournament
All times listed are (UTC+3)

Group stage

Group A

Group B

Group C

Ranking of second-placed teams
At the end of the group stage, a comparison will be made between the second-placed teams of each group. Matches against the fourth-placed team in Group A and B group are not included in this ranking. The best second-placed team advance to the semifinals.

Knockout stage

Semi-finals

Third place play-off

Final

Champion

Goalscorers
4 goals
  Ahmad Al Douni
  Qasim Said

2 goals
  Jaycee Okwunwanne
  Yousef Nasser

1 goal

  Abdulwahab Al Safi
  Yaghoub Karimi
  Omid Nazari
  Hammadi Ahmed
  Amjad Radhi
  Ahmed Yasin
  Khalil Bani Attiah
  Bader Al-Mutawa
  Abdulhadi Khamis
  Abbas Atwi
  Adnan Haidar
  Mohammed Al Seyabi
  Eyad Abugharqud
  Ashraf Nu'man
  Imad Zatara
  Abdullah Otayf
  Ahmad Al Salih

Own goal
  Hamdi Al Masri (playing against Iraq)

References

External links
Official Website

 
2012
2012 in Asian football
2012
2012–13 in Kuwaiti football
2012–13 in Jordanian football
2012–13 in Iraqi football
2012–13 in Iranian football
2012–13 in Omani football
2012–13 in Bahraini football
2012–13 in Yemeni football
2012–13 in Palestinian football
2012–13 in Saudi Arabian football
2012–13 in Lebanese football
2012–13 in Syrian football